David Alan Wilson (born June 10, 1970) is a former American football defensive back who played professionally in the National Football League (NFL).

Wilson was born in Los Angeles, California and attended Reseda High School. He played collegiately at the University of California and was drafted by the Minnesota Vikings in the 7th round of the 1992 NFL Draft, the 183rd overall pick.

Wilson played for the Vikings and the New England Patriots during his brief NFL career.

Living people
1970 births
American football defensive backs
California Golden Bears football players
Minnesota Vikings players
New England Patriots players
Players of American football from Los Angeles
People from Reseda, Los Angeles